Stolmen is an island in Austevoll municipality in Vestland county, Norway.   The  island lies in a large archipelago just north of the Selbjørnsfjorden.  The island of Selbjørn lies to the east, the islands of Huftarøy and Hundvåko lie to the northeast, and the islands of Stora Kalsøy, Litla Kalsøya, and Møkster lie to the north.

The island had 206 inhabitants in 2007.  The commercial centre of Stolmen is the village of Våge on the southern part of the island. Other villages on the island include Årland in the central part and Kvalvåg on the northern part.  Møkster Church is located in the village of Kvalvåg.  The Stolma Bridge connects the island of Stolmen to the neighboring island of Selbjørn.

The word "Såta" is the finite form of "såte" (meaning "haystack") since the shape of the mountain looks like the shape of a small cone-shaped haystack.

See also
List of islands of Norway

References

Islands of Vestland
Austevoll